Haydar, also spelt Hajdar, Hayder, Heidar, Haider, Heydar, and other variants, is an Arabic male given name, also used as a surname, meaning "lion". In Islamic tradition, the name is primarily associated with Ali ibn Abi Talib (first Shia Imam and fourth Rashidun Caliph), the son-in-law and cousin of Muhammad, who was nicknamed "Haydar".

The variants Hyder and Hyderi are Urdu variants used predominantly by Muslims in South Asia.

Hajdar
Hajdar Blloshmi (1860–1936), Albanian politician
Hajdar Muneka (born 1954), Albanian journalist and diplomat

Haydar

Given name
Ali, the son-in-law and cousin of the Islamic prophet Muhammad, said to have been nicknamed "Haydar".
Haydar Paşa, Vizier of Ottoman Empire
Haydar Aşan, Turkish Olympian 
Haydar Ergülen, Turkish poet
Haydar Ghazi, second Wazir of Sylhet
Haydar Hatemi, Iranian artist 
Haydar al-Kuzbari (1920–1996), Syrian military officer 
Haydar al-Sadr (1891–1937), Muslim Iraqi cleric and ayatollah  
Haydar Khan e Amo-oghli (1880–1921), revolutionary and military activist in Iran, Republic of Azerbaijan and Central Asia
Haydar Zorlu, Turkish-German actor
Haydar Astrakhani, Khan of Astrakhan from 1538 through 1541.
Haydar Amuli, or Haydar al-'Obaydi al-Husayni Amoli, a Shi'ite mystic and Sufi philosopher

Middle name
Ali Haydar Şen, Turkish businessman
Mohammed Haydar Zammar (born 1961), Syrian Muslim jihadist and al-Qaida recruiter

Surname
Darren Haydar (born 1979), Canadian professional ice hockey
Kamal Haydar (1933–1980), Yemeni short story writer
Paula Haydar, American academic and translator
Qutb ad-Dīn Haydar, Persian Sufi saint
Shaykh Haydar, a religious leader of the Safaviyya from 1460 to 1488
Sultan Haydar (born 1985), Turkish female long-distance runner of Ethiopian origin

Haidar

 Ibrahim Haidar (1867–1974), Lebanese politician
 Salim Haidar (1911–1980), Lebanese politician
 Haidar Abbas Rizvi, Pakistani Politician

Hayder
 Hayder Ali (1720 - 1782) Founder of Mysore Sultanate and Father of Tipu Sultan
 Baba Hayder e Safdar Wali, a Sufi Saint in Mulbagal, Karnataka, India
 Hayder of Crimea

Other variant spellings
For people with these variant spellings, see:
Heidar
 Haider
 Heydar
Hyder (name)
Hyderi (name)
 Jaider - Spanish version
 Aidar - Brazilian Portuguese variant
 Aydar - Brazilian Portuguese variant

See also
Asad, an Arabic given name meaning "lion"
Hai (surname), a Chinese derivative of Haydar
Haider (surname), an unrelated German surname
Heider (surname), an unrelated German surname
Lions in Islam
Qaswarah

References

Arabic masculine given names
Iranian masculine given names
Islamic culture
Surnames
Turkish masculine given names